Paraparaumu College is a Year 9 to 13 co-educational state school on the Kapiti Coast of New Zealand, approximately 45 minutes drive north of Wellington. There is an international student programme operating with students attending from different countries. The college was opened in 1977.

Facilities 
In February 2018, construction began on a $2.2 million upgrade to the administration block. It was completed in late 2018, and named "Te Manawa".

History 
In 1987 the principal was Neil McDonald, and the roll was 940 students.

From 1988 to 2012, Richard Campbell was the school's principal. Over these 25 years, he oversaw the uniform change from brown and yellow to navy and green, the introduction of NCEA, the introduction of a zoning scheme, and numerous construction projects. The school roll grew to 1340 under his care.

From 2013 to 2018, Gregor Fountain was principal, resigning to become principal of Wellington College – his former school. During this period, the CARE values (Collaborative, Active learner, Respectful and Effective self-manager) were introduced as foundational principles modelling ideal student behaviour in the school.

In term 3 of 2018 Craig Steed arrived as principal, from Freyberg High School in Palmerston North.

Arts 
The school has a jazz band that has attended the Manawatu Jazz Festival Youth Jazz Competition in 2019. The school also offers a range of clubs for students to partake in, run by teachers and students alike. Notable clubs include Debating, SEAR, Politics Club, the Cloud Appreciation Society, Poly Club and the Kapa haka group.

Sports 
Sports offered at Paraparaumu College include; Athletics, Basketball, Badminton, Cricket, Equestrian, Football, Golf, Hockey, Netball, Rugby, Touch and Volleyball.

Notable alumni 
 Ben Bell, mayor of Gore
 Dane Coles (born 1986), All Blacks

References 

Secondary schools in the Wellington Region
Paraparaumu